Eleftherios Venizelos is a former municipality in the Chania regional unit, Crete, Greece. Since the 2011 local government reform it is part of the municipality Chania, of which it is a municipal unit. It is centred on the town of Mournies, due south of the city of Chania. The municipality was named for the Greek statesman Eleftherios Venizelos, who was born in Mournies. Other settlements include the villages of Pasakaki, Nerokouros, Vandes and Agios Georgios. , the population of the municipal unit was 10,586.

References

Populated places in Chania (regional unit)